Jorge Armando Sanabria (born 8 September 1952) is an Argentine retired footballer who is last known to have played as a attacker for Águila.

Career

Sanabria started his career with Argentine side Huracán, where he made 133 league appearances and scored 52 goals. After that, Sanabria signed for AmaZulu in South Africa, where he said, "I go to a team where they were all black. Football there, in general, was black. I arrived and, first, the look ..., a certain rejection ..., I tried to touch them and they moved away as if one were an animal. They ran. When I approached a little boy, he thought I was going to hit him."

After that, Sanabria signed for Salvadoran club Águila, where he said, "They [guerrillas] stopped the bus. "Collaboration for the cause...", they said and asked you for money. They were from the MLN. We had a Brazilian on the team. And once they wanted to take it away. "You, Brazilian, you come with us to the mountain." The guy started crying, but nothing. "You come". And we, at that time, had the player who had scored the only goal for El Salvador in the World Cup in Spain: Zapata. He spoke with the guerrilla so that they would not take the Brazilian."

References

External links
 

Argentine footballers
Association football forwards
Living people
1952 births
Expatriate footballers in El Salvador
Expatriate soccer players in South Africa
Expatriate footballers in Colombia
People from Paso de los Libres
Club Atlético Huracán footballers
Club Atlético Vélez Sarsfield footballers
Club Atlético Independiente footballers
Argentinos Juniors footballers
Quilmes Atlético Club footballers
Central Norte players
Sportspeople from Corrientes Province